Oscar Edvin Herbert Zallhagen (né Andersson, 25 January 1893 – 20 August 1971) was a Swedish track and field athlete. He competed in the discus throw at the 1920 Summer Olympics and placed fourth. Zallhagen won the national discus championships in England (1921) and in Sweden (1913–1922), finishing second in 1923. He was also a leading Swedish shot putter in 1914–1917.

References

1893 births
1971 deaths
Swedish male discus throwers
Olympic athletes of Sweden
Athletes (track and field) at the 1920 Summer Olympics
Athletes from Stockholm